The Federal Communications Law Journal (FCLJ) is a triannual law review published by students of the George Washington University Law School. Established in 1984, the FCLJ covers communications law and is the official journal of the Federal Communications Bar Association.

External links
 

American law journals
George Washington University Law School
Triannual journals
Publications established in 1948
English-language journals